Andesaurus ("Andes lizard") is a genus of basal titanosaurian sauropod dinosaur which existed during the middle of the Cretaceous Period in South America. Like most sauropods, belonging to one of the largest animals ever to walk the Earth, it would have had a small head on the end of a long neck and an equally long tail.

History of discovery

In 1991, paleontologists Jorge Orlando Calvo and José Fernando Bonaparte named Andesaurus, which refers to the Andes and also includes the Greek word sauros ("lizard"), because of the proximity of this animal's remains to the Andes. Andesaurus fossils were found by Alejandro Delgado, after whom the single known species (A. delgadoi) is named.

The only known material of Andesaurus is a partial skeleton consisting of a series of four vertebrae from the lower back, as well as 27 tail vertebrae, divided up into two series from separate parts of the tail. The vertebrae from the middle part of its tail had elongated centra. Elements of the pelvis were also discovered, including two ischia and a pubis bone, along with rib fragments and an incomplete humerus and femur.

Description

The dorsal vertebrae of Andesaurus bear the typical features of an  centrum and large lateral  (pneumatic depression). Potentially diagnostic for Andesaurus, there is an additional ridge supporting the lower articulation for the ribs, although poor preservation in other vertebrae means it can only be identified on one bone. The  of Andesaurus are smaller than more basal sauropods, but less reduced than in Argentinosaurus or Epachthosaurus, where the surface is only articular ridges, and also less reduced than more derived titanosaurs where the articulation is entirely absent. Pre- and post-spinal  are present in the vertebrae of Andesaurus, like in other somphospondylans.

Tail vertebrae (caudals) of Andesaurus are slightly , where the anterior face is concave and the posterior face of convex. This convexity is less prominent than more derived titanosaurs, but is still diagnostic of the clade as a whole. The first caudal has a flat anterior and slightly convex posterior face, different from the subsequent vertebrae similar to in Epachthosaurus. A prominent depression is present on the bottom surface of some anterior caudals, a feature present in diplodocids and multiple titanosaurs. Anterior caudals are shorter proportionally, the bones becoming almost double the proportional length towards the end of the tail. Lateral pleurocoels are present on some vertebrae, as well as small lateral foramina. These foramina are known in some titanosaurs and non-titanosaurs, but their phylogenetic distribution is poorly understood. Like in all titanosauriformes, the neural arch is on the anterior portion of the centrum, and the neural spines are elongate and rectangular. The variation along the caudal series is similar to Epachthosaurus and Malawisaurus.

Classification
Several plesiomorphic (primitive) features characterize Andesaurus as the most basal known member of Titanosauria. In fact, this clade has been defined to contain Andesaurus, Saltasaurus, their most recent common ancestor, and all of its descendants. The most prominent plesiomorphy is the articulations between its tail vertebrae. In most derived titanosaurs, the tail vertebrae articulate with ball-and-socket joints, with the hollowed-out socket end on the front (procoelous caudal vertebrae), while in Andesaurus, both ends of the vertebrae are flat (amphiplatyan caudals), as seen in many non-titanosaurian sauropods. Andesaurus itself is only characterized by a single feature, the tall neural spines on top of its back vertebrae, and needs further study.

Some other basal titanosaurs from Argentina, including Argentinosaurus and Puertasaurus, were also sauropods of enormous size. The most derived group of titanosaurs, the Saltasauridae, included some of the smallest known sauropods, including Saltasaurus itself. Thus it is possible that the largest sizes were attained among the more basal members of the clade.

Palaeoecology

These fossils were discovered in the Candeleros Formation, the oldest formation within the Neuquén Group of Neuquén Province, Argentina. This formation dates to the Cenomanian stage of the Late Cretaceous period, about 99.6 to 97 million years ago. For the most part, the Candeleros represents an ancient braided river system. Besides Andesaurus, the formation also contains fossils of the theropods Buitreraptor and Giganotosaurus, as well as other sauropods including the rebbachisaurid Limaysaurus.

References

Bibliography
 Novas, F.E., Salgado, L., Calvo, J.O., & Agnolin, F. 2005. Giant titanosaur (Dinosauria, Sauropoda) from the Late Cretaceous of Patagonia. Revista del Museo Argentino de Ciencias Naturales 7(1): 37-41.
 Salgado, L., Coria, R.A., & Calvo, J.O. 1997. Evolution of titanosaurid Sauropods. I: Phylogenetic analysis based on the postcranial evidence. Ameghiniana. 34: 3-32.
 Tidwell, V., Carpenter, K. & Meyer, S. 2001. New Titanosauriform (Sauropoda) from the Poison Strip Member of the Cedar Mountain Formation (Lower Cretaceous), Utah. In: Mesozoic Vertebrate Life. D. H. Tanke & K. Carpenter (eds.). Indiana University Press, Eds. D.H. Tanke & K. Carpenter. Indiana University Press. 139-165.
 Upchurch, P., Barrett, P.M, & Dodson, P. 2004. Sauropoda. In: Weishampel, D.B., Dodson, P., & Osmolska, H. (Eds.). The Dinosauria (2nd Edition). Berkeley: University of California Press. Pp. 259–322.

Further reading
 Calvo, J.O. & Bonaparte, J.F. 1991. "Andesaurus delgadoi gen. et sp. nov. (Saurischia-Sauropoda), dinosaurio Titanosauridae de la Formacion Rio Limay (Albiano-Cenomaniano), Neuquén, Argentina" [Andesaurus delgadoi n. g. n. sp. (Saurischia, Sauropoda) a titanosaurid dinosaur from the Río Limay Formation (Albian-Cenomanian), Neuquén, Argentina.] Ameghiniana. 28: 303-310. [In Spanish]
 Wilson, J.A. & Upchurch, P. 2003. A revision of Titanosaurus Lydekker (Dinosauria – Sauropoda), the first dinosaur genus with a ‘Gondwanan’ distribution. Journal of Systematic Palaeontology'' 1(3): 125–160.

Titanosaurs
Late Cretaceous dinosaurs of South America
Cretaceous Argentina
Fossils of Argentina
Cenomanian life
Fossil taxa described in 1991
Taxa named by Jorge O. Calvo
Taxa named by José Bonaparte
Candeleros Formation